Macarena Santos i Torres, (born 8 April 1970) is a Spanish writer who writes under the name "Care Santos". She writes in both Catalan and Spanish languages, for both young and adult readers.

Biography
Care Santos studied law and Spanish philology at the University of Barcelona. She started her career as a journalist at Diari de Barcelona  and later worked for the papers ABC and El Mundo. In 1995, Santos was recognized for her first book, a collection of novels with the title Cuentos cítricos. Her next books were Trigal con cuervos and Los ojos del lobo.

Awards and honors
 In 2007, her book Dissection received the Carmen Conde Women's Poetry Award,
The latter book was translated into several languages. 
 In 2013, she won the Joaquim Ruyra Award for best youth book for her work No em preguntis qui. sóc. 
 On 20 January 2014, Care Santos was awarded the Premi de les Lletres Catalanes Ramon Llull Award for the book Desig de xocolata, which was released on 6 March 2014.
 In 2017, she was awarded the Premio Nadal.

Selected works
El tango del perdedor (1997)
Trigal con cuervos (1999)
Aprender a huir (2000)
La muerte de Kurt Cobain (1997)
Okupada (1997)
Te diré quién eres (1997)
La ruta del huracán (1999)
Krysis (2001)
Operación Virgo (2002)
Laluna.com (2003)
Los ojos del lobo (2004)
El circuito de Montecarlo (2005)
El anillo de Irina (2005)
El dueño de las sombras (2006)
La muerte de Venus (2007)
Habitaciones cerradas (2012) ,

Works in English
Desire for chocolate, translator Julie Wark, Richmond, Surrey Alma Books, 2016. , 
Dissection, translator Lawrence Schimel, New York: A Midsummer Nights Press, 2014. ,

References

1970 births
Living people
Women writers from Catalonia
Spanish women journalists
Spanish women novelists
20th-century Spanish women writers
20th-century Spanish writers
21st-century Spanish women writers